Denning Iosua Tyrell (born May 9, 1976 in Motootua) is a Samoan rugby union player. He plays as a scrum-half.

Career
He debuted for Samoa in 2000, against Fiji, at Apia, on June 3, 2000. He was part of the 2003 Rugby World Cup roster, where the match against South Africa at Brisbane. He also played for Wanganui and Taranaki in the NPC.

External links

Denning Iosua Tyrell at New Zealand Rugby History

1976 births
Living people
Samoan rugby union players
Samoan expatriates in New Zealand
Rugby union scrum-halves
Samoa international rugby union players